Roger Staub (1 July 1936 – 30 June 1974) was a Swiss alpine ski racer and Olympic gold medalist.

Born in Arosa, Graubünden, Staub won the giant slalom at the 1960 Winter Olympics in Squaw Valley and also won multiple medals at the 1958 World Championships. He finished fourth in the Olympic downhill in 1956 at age 19. He also won a number of Swiss national titles.

After a brief career as a professional racer in the early 1960s, Staub became ski school director at the fledgling Vail resort in Colorado. He also had a ski school in Arosa and sporting goods interests in Switzerland.

During a summer visit to Switzerland in 1974 with his wife and young child, Staub was killed in a ski gliding accident near Verbier on the eve of his 38th birthday.

World championship results 

From 1948 through 1980, the Winter Olympics were also the World Championships for alpine skiing.

Olympic results

Note

References

External links
 
 
 

1936 births
1974 deaths
Swiss male alpine skiers
Alpine skiers at the 1956 Winter Olympics
Alpine skiers at the 1960 Winter Olympics
Olympic gold medalists for Switzerland
Aviators killed in aviation accidents or incidents
Olympic medalists in alpine skiing
Medalists at the 1960 Winter Olympics
Victims of aviation accidents or incidents in 1974
Victims of aviation accidents or incidents in Switzerland
Sportspeople from Graubünden